Bedell may refer to:

People
 Berkley Bedell (1921–2019), American politician
  (1868–1958), cofounder of Physical Review, the first American journal of physics
 Geraldine Bedell, journalist and author
 Grace Bedell (1848–1936), author of a letter to President Lincoln that inspired his beard
 Gregory T. Bedell (1817–1892), Episcopal Bishop of Ohio
 Howie Bedell (born 1935), former Major League Baseball player
 Lew Bedell (1919–2000), comedian and founder of the Era and Doré record labels
 John Patrick Bedell, gunman involved in the 2010 Pentagon shooting
 Ralph Clairon Bedell, Chief Executive of the Secretariat of the Pacific Community 1955–1958
 William Bedell (1571–1642), Anglican churchman

Other uses
 Bedel or Bedell, an administrative official at universities in several European countries
 Bedell (company), a legal and fiduciary firm
 Bedell Crossing, Maine, a village, United States
 Bedell, New Brunswick, a settlement, Canada
 Bedell, New York, a hamlet, United States
 Bedell Building, former name of Cascade Building, Portland, Oregon, United States
 Bedell Covered Bridge, New Hampshire, United States
 Esquire Bedell, a junior ceremonial officer of a university

See also
 Beadle (disambiguation)
 Bedel (disambiguation)
 David Bedell-Sivright (1880–1915), Scottish international rugby union captain
 Walter Bedell Smith (1895–1961), Dwight D. Eisenhower's Chief of Staff, often referred to as "Beetle" Smith